Diatraea lisetta is a moth in the family Crambidae. It was described by Harrison Gray Dyar Jr. in 1909. It is found in Panama, Mexico and the United States, where it has been recorded from Alabama, Florida, Georgia, Louisiana, Maryland, Mississippi, South Carolina, Tennessee and Virginia.

References

Chiloini
Moths described in 1909